The Enemy Within is a fantasy horror novel by Christie Golden, set in the world of Ravenloft, and based on the Dungeons & Dragons game.

Plot summary
Sir Tristan Hiregaard periodically transforms into Malken, an evil beastly creature who controls a large criminal empire.  Tristan is terrified by these transformations, and sets out to destroy his evil side.

Reception

Reviews
Science Fiction Chronicle

Notes

References

Sources
 Review by Don D'Ammassa (1994) in Science Fiction Chronicle #172 (April & May 1994).

1994 American novels
Novels by Christie Golden
Ravenloft novels